Harry Collier (1 October 1907 – 16 August 1994) was an Australian rules footballer in the Victorian Football League.

Family
Collier was the older brother of former champion Collingwood player (and the 1929 Brownlow Medal winner) Albert.

Playing career
Originally from Ivanhoe, Victoria, Collier played for the Collingwood Football Club, debuting in 1926. Collier was a player in Collingwood's legendary premiership sides from 1927–1930, the only side to have won four premierships in a row in the entire history of the VFL/AFL.

He was appointed captain in 1935, a position which he held until 1939. During this period, his team won two premierships (in 1935 and 1936)), and finished runners-up in the other three years he was captain. He was said to be Collingwood's best player during the era, taking out the Club Best and Fairest award in 1928 and 1930. Collier retired in 1940 after only one game for the season - his career record standing at 259 games and 299 goals with the Magpies.

Post-playing career
Following his playing career, Collier coached the Essendon reserves to a premiership in 1941. He later became a committeeman for Collingwood.

Collier was also a noted television personality, during the time of Australia's first year of broadcasting in 1956 and subsequent years.

Death
Collier died in 1994.

Honours
Collier was retrospectively rewarded a Brownlow Medal, after originally tying for the 1930 award. He, Stan Judkins (Richmond) and Allan Hopkins (Footscray) all finished with an equal number of votes. The Umpires Board (which administered the award) recommended that no medal be awarded as there were inconsistent provisions within the rules for the event of a tie; and, among three informal votes cast during the year, one vote from a Collingwood game was simply labeled "Collier", but as there were two Collier brothers playing in the game, the vote was not counted. The VFL board ultimately overruled the umpires board, and used the criterion that stated the medal be awarded to the player who polled the highest percentage of votes against games played to award the medal to Judkins. To avoid situations like this in the future the rules were altered to a 3-2-1 system in 1931. In 1989, the VFL retrospectively eliminated the countbacks from all tied Brownlow Medal results, and Hopkins and Collier, while both still living, were awarded joint 1930 Brownlow Medals.

Other honours include his posthumous induction into Collingwood's Team of the Century and, in 1996, induction into the Australian Football Hall of Fame.

Notes

References 
 
 Australian Football Hall of Fame

External links 

1907 births
1994 deaths
Australian rules footballers from Melbourne
Australian Rules footballers: place kick exponents
Ivanhoe Amateurs Football Club players
Collingwood Football Club players
Collingwood Football Club Premiership players
Australian Football Hall of Fame inductees
Brownlow Medal winners
Copeland Trophy winners
Camberwell Football Club players
Australian television personalities
Six-time VFL/AFL Premiership players
People from Collingwood, Victoria